The 28th Miss Chinese International Pageant, Miss Chinese International Pageant 2017 was held on January 15, 2017. Miss Chinese International 2016 Jennifer Coosemans of Vancouver, British Columbia, Canada crowned her successor Stitch Yu of New York City at the end of the pageant.

Pageant information
The slogan to this year's pageant was "Searching for the Ultimate Level of Beauty" 「追尋極美層次」.  The masters of ceremony this year were Eric Tsang, Louis Yuen, Astrid Chan, and Janis Chan.  There were two judging panels this year, along with the main judging panel is the return of the Elegant Judging Panel, which consists of Hong Kong celebrities associated with organizer TVB.   However, the Elegant Judging Panel do not interfere with the actual scoring of the pageant, rather provide the viewers of how the delegates fared in the minds of these celebrities on the panel.  The top 3 scoring delegates from the Elegant Judging Panel for the first three rounds of competition were announced.  This year, the pageant is being co-organized by Astro Wah Lai Toi television station in Malaysia and the venue has been moved to Arena of Stars, inside the Genting Highlands resort in the state of Pahang.

Judges

Main judging panel
Tan Sri Dato' Seri Michelle Yeoh, Chinese-Malaysian actress
Simon Yam, Hong Kong film actor, and director
Wayne Lai, Hong Kong television actor
Niki Chow, Hong Kong actress, model, and singer
Dato Nancy Yeoh, President, STYLO International

Results

Special awards

Contestant list

References

External links
 Miss Chinese International Pageant 2017 Official Site

TVB
2017 beauty pageants
Beauty pageants in Hong Kong
Miss Chinese International Pageants
2017 in Hong Kong